Narcisso is a ghost town in southwest Cottle County, Texas, United States.

External links
 

Geography of Cottle County, Texas
Ghost towns in North Texas